Romolo Calabrese, is an Italian architect, active nationally and internationally in the design field and in theoretical debate. He was born in Milan and studied architecture at Politecnico di Milano where he graduated in 1998. From 1995 to 1997 he trained at Aldo Rossi's office, who he collaborated with on several projects. In 1999 he founded RRC Studio Architetti in Milan and in 2003 he opened a second office in Cap d'Ail, France. By participating in many architectural competitions, he won in 2007 the first prize for the construction of a block of "Viviendas y Oficinas" in Zaragoza, a project within Expo 2008's urban development of the city. Later he participated in Rizoma's exhibition: "Biennale Giovani Architetti Italiani". In 2012 he won the first prize for a secondary school in Berlingo.

In 2011 he founded STUDIO Architecture and Urbanism magazine.

Selected projects

Publications
 Illegal Act, on Illegal, December 2014
 From Political Ideologies to Market Ideologies, on Power, June 2014 
 Dreiländereck, on Import Export, November 2013 article
 Transforming the Un-Changed, on Transformation, May 2013
 Entrez Lentement, on Original, April 2012 article
 A forced resurrection/The news, on [from]Crisis[to], January 2012

References

Further reading 

  Artwort, Dal Qatar alla Cina – Intervista a Romolo Calabrese, January 2015 article
 "Al Dhakira Oasis in the desert - Qatar" in "GreenBuilding, Moscow" November 2014 article
 "Multifunctional complex - Shanghai" in "TallBuilding, Moscow" September 2014 article
 "Expanding a Vision - Qatar" in "Landscape, Dubai" July 2014 article
 "New Town Masterplan - Pudong, China" in "Concept, Seoul korea" April 2014 article
 "Three Tower - Shanghai" in "Beyond 22, China" March 2014 article
 "A Landmark & Strong, Elegant Presence on the Skyline - Changsha" in "Beyond 21, China" February 2014 article
 Archea, Contemporary itinerary: Milan, in ":it:Area (rivista)" n. 125, November/December 2012
 Massimo Frontera, Milano, Uffici nel monolite nero, in "Il Sole 24 Ore - Progetti e Concorsi", July 2012 article
 Paola Pierotti, Scuola di Berlingo, Rrc vince il concorso..., in "Il Sole 24 Ore - Progetti e Concorsi web", June 2012 article
 EDA CL, Entrevista a Romolo Calabrese article
 Stella Armando, Arte verde, così cambia Chiantown in "Corriere della Sera" June 8, 2009 article
 RIZOMA Overground/Underground. Biennale giovani architetti italiani, Maschietto Editore e Tagete Edizioni, Italy 2008
 Alice Gramigna, Il gioco dei volumi di Calabrese, in "ioArchitetto", April 2008 article
 Ivana Zambianchi, Giochi di facciata, in "Bravacasa", April 2008 article
 RRC studio a Saragozza, in "Modulo", February 2008 article
 Calabrese: "Copiamo il modello iberico", in "La Preaplina", year 121 n. 35, February 2008 article
 Expo 2008 a Saragozza, in "AL", January/February 2008 articolo
 Residenze e uffici Manzana 6, Zaragozza in "l'ARCA", January 2008 article
 Saragozza Fare città in "Costruire", n. 296, January 2008 article
 CPC Sport Center, in "C3Korea", n.281, January 2008 magazine
 Architetti <<Generazione Erasmus>>, in RITAGLI, Archivio Notizie Ordine degli Architetti di Milano, January 2008 article
 Costruzioni italiane all'Expo 2008 di Saragozza, in "Tribuna Economica", year 22 n.1, January 2008 article
 I volti e le opere dei giovani architetti italiani che disegnano il futuro (all'estero), in "Il Sole 24 Ore", January 2008 article
 Paola Pierotti, Saragozza, torri italiane all'Expo, in "Il Sole 24 Ore", November 2007 article
 Carmen Martínez Alfonso, Más de 1.800 pisos del barrio del AVE tendrán propietario y diseño este año, in "El Periódico de Aragón", July 31, 2007, pag. 8 article
 M. LLorente, Zaragoza Alta Velocidad ha elegido también el proyecto del milanés Rómulo Roberto Calabrese para construir otras 140 viviendas más, in ":es:Heraldo de Aragón", July 2007 article

External links 
 

1966 births
Living people
Architects from Milan